Route 541 is a  state highway stretching from Route 50 in Eleele near Hanapepe, Hawaii to a dead end at Port Allen at Hanapepe Bay.  The road mainly connects port traffic and tourist traffic where many water-based tourism businesses are located.

Route description
Route 541 begins at a parking lot for the Port Allen cruise port, traveling northeast along Waialdo Road as an undivided road for  before a center median splits the road for the remainder of its route to an intersection with Route 50, the Kaumaualii Highway. The roadway continues north after this intersection as Eleele Road.

Major intersections

References

External links

Route Log for Hawaii Route 541

 0541
Transportation in Kauai County, Hawaii
State highways in the United States shorter than one mile